The 1973 Lynchburg Baptist Flames football team represented Lynchburg Baptist College (now known as Liberty University) in the 1973 NAIA football season as an independent. Led by coach Lee Royer, the Flames compiled a 3–3 record in the school's first season. 

Royer died on November 20 in a plane crash.

Schedule

References

Lynchburg Baptist
Liberty Flames football seasons
Lynchburg Baptist Flames football